Brian Ahern (born 15 November 1952 in Glasgow), is a Scottish former football midfielder.

Ahern is best known for his time at Clyde, where he holds the current record for most league appearances in the history of the club, at 420 appearances. He made 504 appearances in all competitions. Ahern was also the captain during the latter stages of his Clyde career, and he captained the side to the Scottish Second Division trophy during their centenary year.

He was the solitary Clyde player selected for a Glasgow Select XI against the Football League XI to mark the Silver Jubilee in 1977, but was an unused substitute. Ahern was picked for the Scotland semi professional team in 1981.

Honours 

 Clyde
 Scottish Second Division: 1972–73, 1977–78
Glasgow Cup: Runner-up 1970–71

 Scotland Semi-Pro
Four Nations Tournament: Runner-up 1981

 Individual
Clyde FC Player of the Year: 1977–78
Clyde FC Hall of Fame: Inducted, 2015

See also
 List of footballers in Scotland by number of league appearances (500+)

References

External links

Living people
1952 births
Scottish footballers
Scottish Football League players
Clyde F.C. players
Ayr United F.C. players
Albion Rovers F.C. players
Scottish Junior Football Association players
Cambuslang Rangers F.C. players
Association football midfielders
Footballers from Glasgow